Parkland is a hamlet in southern Alberta, Canada within the Municipal District of Willow Creek No. 26.

Demographics 
Parkland recorded a population of 50 in the 1991 Census of Population conducted by Statistics Canada.

See also 
List of communities in Alberta
List of hamlets in Alberta

References 

Hamlets in Alberta
Municipal District of Willow Creek No. 26